Upn or UPN may refer to:  


Television
 UPN, a defunct American television network
 UPN Kids (1995–1999), an American children's programming block

Education
 National Pedagogic University (Mexico) (Spanish: Universidad Pedagógica Nacional), Mexico City, Mexico
 Private University of the North (Spanish: Universidad Privada del Norte), Trujillo, Peru
 Universities of National Development "Veteran", Indonesia
 University of National Development "Veteran" East Java, Surabaya
 University of National Development "Veteran" Jakarta, Jakarta
 University of National Development "Veteran" Yogyakarta, Sleman

Politics
 Navarrese People's Union (Spanish: Unión del Pueblo Navarro), a political party in Spain
 Nigerien Progressive Union (French: Union progressiste nigérienne), a former political party in Niger
 Unity Party of Nigeria, a now-defunct political party from the Nigerian Second Republic

Other uses
 Unique Pupil Number, held in the National Pupil Database in the U.K.
 Universal Product Number, a subset of the UPC barcode used for medical products
 Universal Principal Name, an object in Subject Alternative Name extension in X.509 certificate
 UPN (notation) or Reverse Polish notation, a mathematical notation in which operators follow their operands
 Upn, the symbol for the chemical element unpentnilium
 UP-N, the abbreviation for the Union Pacific / North Line, a Metra line in the Chicago metropolitan area
 Uruapan International Airport (IATA: UPN), Uruapan, Michoacán, Mexico
Ústav pamäti národa, National Memory Institute of Slovakia
 User Principal Name, a Windows Active Directory username in an email address format